The Oldham trolleybus system once served the town of Oldham, then in Lancashire, but now in Greater Manchester, England.

History

When Ashton Corporation decided to replace the trams on its share of this tramway with trolleybuses, it asked Oldham Corporation to do the same. Oldham Corporation agreed, and acquired two trolleybuses, being Oldham's share of a combined order for ten.

However, the Ashton Corporation continued to run trolleybuses on its section of the route for much longer.

Services
By the standards of the various now defunct trolleybus systems in the United Kingdom, the Oldham system was very small, with only one route.

Fleet
The system had a maximum fleet of only two Short-bodied Railless trolleybuses.

Neither of the former Oldham trolleybuses is recorded as having survived.

See also

History of Oldham
Transport in Oldham
Trolleybuses in Ashton-under-Lyne
List of trolleybus systems in the United Kingdom

References

Notes

Further reading

External links

National Trolleybus Archive
British Trolleybus Society, based in Reading.
National Trolleybus Association, based in London.

Bus transport in Greater Manchester
Oldham
Oldham
History of the Metropolitan Borough of Oldham
History of transport in Greater Manchester